Theodorus Hendrikus "Theo" Bot (20 July 1911 – 24 September 1984) was a Dutch politician and diplomat of the defunct Catholic People's Party (KVP) now merged into the Christian Democratic Appeal (CDA) party and jurist.

Bot attended a Gymnasium in Utrecht from May 1924 until June 1930 and applied at the Utrecht University in June 1930 majoring in Law and obtaining a Bachelor of Laws degree in July 1932 before graduating with a Master of Laws degree in July 1936. Bot also applied at the Royal Military Academy in Breda in January 1933 to be trained as a reserve Artillery Officer in the Royal Netherlands East Indies Army graduating as a Lieutenant in September 1936. Bot worked as a civil servant for the Dutch East Indies Government in West Java from November 1936 until March 1942 in Purwakarta from November 1936 until August 1939 and in Sukabumi from August 1939 until March 1942. On 10 May 1940 Nazi Germany invaded the Netherlands and the government fled to London to escape the German occupation. Bot was called to active duty and served in an air defense artillery platoon during the Dutch East Indies campaign. On 8 March 1942 Bot was captured following the Battle of Borneo and detained in the Japanese internment camp Kampong Makassar. Bot was later transferred to the internment camp Thanbyuzayat in Burma to work on the Burma Railway and was detained until 30 September 1945 and following the end of World War II moved back to the Netherlands. Bot worked as a civil servant for the Ministry of Colonial Affairs from March 1946 until March 1949 as Deputy Director-General of the department for Constitutional Reform from March 1946 until June 1948 and as Deputy Director-General of the department for Political Affairs from June 1948 until March 1949. Bot worked as political advisor for the High Commissioner of the Dutch East Indies Tony Lovink from March 1949 until December 1949. Bot served as Deputy Secretary-General of the Netherlands-Indonesian Union and as a political consultant for the Ministry of Colonial Affairs from December 1949 tot March 1954. Bot worked as a civil servant for the Ministry of Foreign Affairs as Director-General of the department for NATO and Western European Union affairs from March 1954 until November 1959

After the election of 1959 Bot was appointed as State Secretary for the Interior in the Cabinet De Quay, taking office on 23 November 1959. Bot was elected as a Member of the House of Representatives after the election of 1963, taking office on 2 July 1963. Following the cabinet formation of 1963 Bot was appointed Minister of Education, Arts and Sciences in the Cabinet Marijnen, taking office on 24 July 1963. The Cabinet Marijnen fell on 27 February 1965 after a disagreement in the coalition about reforms to the public broadcasting system and continued to serve in a demissionary capacity until the cabinet formation of 1965 when it was replaced by the Cabinet Cals with Bot appointed as Minister for Aid to Developing Countries, taking office on 14 April 1965. The Cabinet Cals fell on 14 October 1966 after the Leader of the Catholic People's Party Norbert Schmelzer had proposed a motion that called for a stronger austerity policy to further reduce the deficit was seen an indirect motion of no confidence and continued to serve in a demissionary capacity until the cabinet formation of 1966 when it was replaced by the caretaker Cabinet Zijlstra with Bot continuing as Minister for Aid to Developing Countries, taking office on 22 November 1966. In December 1966 Bot announced that he wouldn't stand for the election of 1967. Following the cabinet formation of 1967 Bot was not giving a cabinet post in the new cabinet, the Cabinet Zijlstra was replaced by the Cabinet De Jong on 5 April 1967.

Bot remained in active in national politics, in September 1967 he was nominated as Ambassador to Canada, taking office on 17 January 1968. In June 1973 Bot was nominated as Permanent Representative to the International Atomic Energy Agency (IAEA) and Ambassador to Austria, he resigned as Ambassador to Canada the same day he was installed as Permanent Representative to the IAEA and Ambassador to Austria, serving from 1 July 1973 until 1 August 1976.

Bot retired after spending 16 years in national politics and became active in the public sector and occupied numerous seats as a nonprofit director on several boards of directors and supervisory boards (UNICEF, United Nations Commission on Science and Technology for Development (CSTD), Oxfam Novib and the Transnational Institute) and served on several state commissions and councils on behalf of the government (Cadastre Agency, Public Pension Funds PFZW, National Insurance Bank and KPN) and served as an diplomat and lobbyist for several economic delegations on behalf of the government.

Bot was known for his abilities as a negotiator and consensus builder. Bot continued to comment on political affairs until his is death at the age of 73 and holds the distinction as the  first serving Minister for Development Cooperation. His eldest son Ben is also a politician and diplomat and who served as Minister of Foreign Affairs from 3 December 2003 until 22 February 2007.

Biography

Early life
Theodorus Hendrikus Bot was born on 20 July 1911 in Dordrecht in the Province of South Holland in a Roman Catholic family as one of three sons of Maria Theresia Frederica Creemers and Lourens Bot, a German language teacher. From 1923 to 1930 he went to the "Gemeentelijk Gymnasium" high school in Apeldoorn, and studied Indonesian law at Utrecht University from 1930 to September 1936. He also followed an education at the "School voor Reserve-Officieren der Bereden-Artillerie" (English: School for Reserve-Officers of the Horse-Artillery) in Ede.

Civil service
From 1936 to 1942 Bot was sent out for the civil service to the Dutch East Indies and would serve with the east-Asian service in Batavia, Purwakarta and Soekaboemi. During World War II he was in active service from 1940 to 8 March 1942 in the rank of reserve-first lieutenant of the horse-artillery. Afterwards he was a Japanese warprisoner at camps in Java, Birma and Thailand, until 30 September 1945, and worked on the Burma Railway. After the war he returned to the Netherlands in 1946, where he functioned in several functions related to the Dutch East Indies.

Politics
Bot served as State Secretary of the Interior, in charge of matters concerning Netherlands New Guinea, from 23 November 1959 until 24 July 1963 in the De Quay cabinet. He was shortly a member of the House of Representatives from 2 July until 24 July 1963 when he became Minister of Education, Culture and Science in the Marijnen cabinet. He finally served as Minister without portfolio in charge of matters concerning development aid, from 14 April 1965 until 5 April 1967, in the Cals and Zijlstra cabinets.

After his membership of the cabinet he was appointed Dutch ambassador in Ottawa, Ontario, Canada in September 1967, serving from 17 January 1968 until July 1973. Consequently, he became ambassador in Vienna, Austria, and permanent representative to the International Atomic Energy Agency from July 1973 until 1 August 1976.

Other functions
 Chairman "Academie Leken Missie Actie" (English: Academy Non-religious Mission Action), 1959 
 Honorary national advisor for development aid, since 1976 
 Chairman National Committee in preparation of the UN-conference on Science and Technology for Development
 Chairman Dutch delegation at the board of UNICEF 
 Chairman Foundation National Committee international year of the child 1979

Personal
In 1936 he married Elisabeth W. van Hal. They had seven children. He is the father of Ben Bot, who would become minister of foreign affairs.

Decorations

References

External links

  Mr. Th.H. (Theo) Bot Parlement & Politiek

 

 

 

 

 

1911 births
1984 deaths
Ambassadors of the Netherlands to Austria
Ambassadors of the Netherlands to Canada
Burma Railway prisoners
Cold War diplomats
Commanders of the Order of Orange-Nassau
Commandeurs of the Légion d'honneur
Dutch expatriates in Austria
Dutch expatriates in Canada
Dutch expatriates in Indonesia
Dutch expatriates in the United States
Dutch expatriates in Switzerland
Dutch lobbyists
Dutch nonprofit directors
Dutch nonprofit executives
Dutch officials of the United Nations
Dutch people of World War II
Dutch political consultants
Dutch prisoners of war in World War II
Dutch Roman Catholics
Graduates of the Koninklijke Militaire Academie
Grand Officers of the Order of the Crown (Belgium)
International Atomic Energy Agency officials
Knights of the Holy Sepulchre
Knights of the Order of the Netherlands Lion
Ministers for Development Cooperation of the Netherlands
Ministers of Education of the Netherlands
Members of the House of Representatives (Netherlands)
People from Batavia, Dutch East Indies
People from Dordrecht
Recipients of the Grand Decoration for Services to the Republic of Austria
Royal Netherlands East Indies Army officers
Royal Netherlands East Indies Army personnel of World War II
State Secretaries for the Interior of the Netherlands
Utrecht University alumni
World War II prisoners of war held by Japan
20th-century Dutch civil servants
20th-century Dutch diplomats
20th-century Dutch jurists
20th-century Dutch politicians